Mehdiabad (also Romanized as Mehdīābād) is a village in Miyan Kaleh Rural District, in the Central District of Behshahr County, Mazandaran Province, Iran. At the 2006 census, its population was 178, in 57 families.

References 

Populated places in Behshahr County